Boô-Silhen is a commune in the Hautes-Pyrénées department in southwestern France.

Population

The inhabitants of the commune are known as Boôsilheniens.

See also
Communes of the Hautes-Pyrénées department

References

Communes of Hautes-Pyrénées